Jessica Raine (born Jessica Helen Lloyd; 20 May 1982) is an English actress. She is best known for her roles as Jenny Lee in the television series Call the Midwife (2012–2014) and Verity Lambert in the television film An Adventure in Space and Time (2013). Raine portrayed Catherine Parr in Becoming Elizabeth, a historical drama featuring Elizabeth I as a teenager.

Early life and education
Raine was born Jessica Helen Lloyd, on 20 May 1982, in Eardisley, Herefordshire, where she was raised on her father's farm. She is the younger of two daughters of farmer Allan Lloyd (descended from the Lloyd family of Baynham Hall, who were well known for generations as bonesetters alongside their farming activities), and his wife Sue, who trained as a dancer and then worked as a nurse. Educated in Kington, Herefordshire, she wanted to be an actress from the age of 13, as her father starred in amateur dramatics with the Eardisley Little Theatre.

In sixth form she studied theatre at A-Level and a BTEC in photography at Hereford College of Arts and studied drama and cultural studies at the University of the West of England, Bristol. After graduating, she was turned down by every drama school she applied to, so went to Thailand and taught English as a second language.

Career

Career beginnings and theatre work
Returning home after a year, she applied to the Royal Academy of Dramatic Art a second time and was accepted. Moving to London in anticipation of starting her course, she worked part-time as a waitress and for the company BT Group.

After graduating in 2008, Raine began a successful stage career, initially cast as Lesley Sharp's goth daughter in Simon Stephens's Harper Regan. She played Tamsin Greig's 16-year-old daughter in David Hare's Gethsemane.

Raine played at the National Theatre in Mike Bartlett's Earthquakes in London as teenage wild-child Jasmine; and then as a secretary in the revival of Clifford Odets's Rocket to the Moon. She has also appeared in Ghosts and Punk Rock, for which she won the Manchester Evening News Award for Best Supporting Actress. She played a role in the Young Vic's revival of Middleton and Rowley's 17th-century tragedy, The Changeling. In 2012 Raine starred in Beyond Ballets Russes at the London Coliseum.

Film, radio and television
Raine's first screen credits were an appearance in a 2009 episode of Garrow's Law and a small role in the 2010 film Robin Hood.

She starred as the lead character Jenny Lee in the first three series of the BBC One drama Call the Midwife. On 9 March 2014, it was announced that Raine was leaving the show at the end of series 3 to pursue a career in film in the United States.

In radio, she has played Felice in the Murray Gold play Kafka the Musical, broadcast in April 2011 on BBC Radio 3. She also played the part of Kasey in Ed Harris' radio play The Wall, first broadcast in February 2011.

Raine was a guest star in the 2013 Doctor Who episode "Hide". Later that year, she appeared as Doctor Whos original producer, Verity Lambert, in the fact-based drama An Adventure in Space and Time, showing the creation of the series as part of its fiftieth anniversary celebrations.

In February 2014, Raine joined the cast of the BBC Two police drama Line of Duty for series 2 as Detective Constable Georgia Trotman working for the AC12 anti corruption unit.

In July 2015, Raine played Tuppence Beresford in the series Partners in Crime based on Agatha Christie's Tommy and Tuppence stories, though the series is set in 1952 rather than the 1920s.

In 2017, Raine played Alison Laithwaite in The Last Post, which she has described as "...my favourite character I've played so far, ever. It was a real transformation.... She's kind of self-destructive, witty and she's climbing the walls with frustration and boredom, but she just wants to have fun." This was seen as a very different role to her Call the Midwife character.

In 2019, Raine played Genevieve Taylor, a British liaison officer for Europol in the Netherlands, in the BBC One drama series Baptiste.

Personal life
Raine began a relationship with fellow actor Tom Goodman-Hill in 2010 after they met while appearing in the play Earthquakes in London. They married on 30 August 2015. In 2019, she gave birth to a son.

Filmography

Film

Television

Radio

Stage

Awards and nominations

References

External links 
 
 Jessica Raine @ the National Theatre
 Interview with Official London Theatre Guide

1982 births
Living people
Alumni of RADA
Alumni of the University of the West of England, Bristol
British stage actresses
British television actresses
English film actresses
English people of Welsh descent
English radio actresses
English stage actresses
English television actresses
People from Herefordshire
Teachers of English as a second or foreign language
21st-century English actresses